The 2012 UEFA Super Cup was the 37th UEFA Super Cup, an annual football match organised by UEFA and contested by the reigning champions of the two main European club competitions, the UEFA Champions League and the UEFA Europa League. It was played at the Stade Louis II in Monaco on 31 August 2012, between the 2011–12 UEFA Champions League winners Chelsea of England and the 2011–12 UEFA Europa League winners Atlético Madrid of Spain.

This was the last Super Cup to be played at the Stade Louis II, which had hosted the match since 1998, as future editions began to be hosted at different venues, starting with the 2013 edition, which was played at Eden Arena in Prague.

Atlético Madrid won 4–1 to claim their second UEFA Super Cup. Radamel Falcao scored a first-half hat-trick and Miranda added a fourth for Atlético on the hour mark, before Gary Cahill scored a consolation goal for Chelsea in the 75th minute.

Venue
The Stade Louis II in Monaco was the venue for the UEFA Super Cup every year since 1998. Built in 1985, the stadium is also the home of AS Monaco, who play in the French league system.

The net capacity of the Stade Louis II was 18,000. Over 70 percent of the tickets were reserved for the general public and supporters of the two clubs. Chelsea and Atlético distributed their tickets directly to their fans. The ticket category available for the general public was Category 1 (Première) opposite the main stand at a price of €70. The international general public ticket sales process began, exclusively via UEFA.com, on 15 June and ended on 2 July.

Teams

There had previously been four English-Spanish encounters in the UEFA Super Cup (1979, 1980, 1982, 1998), with English teams winning three out of four.

Match

Details

Statistics

See also
Atlético Madrid in European football
Chelsea F.C. in international football competitions

References

External links
2012 UEFA Super Cup, UEFA.com

2012
Super Cup
2012 in Monégasque sport
Super Cup 2012
Super Cup 2012
2012–13 in English football
2012–13 in Spanish football
International club association football competitions hosted by Monaco
August 2012 sports events in Europe